Blakdyak  (July 25, 1969 – November 21, 2016) was a Filipino actor, comedian and reggae singer. He was known as "The King of Pinoy Reggae".

Early life
Blakdyak was born Joseph Amoto Formaran on July 25, 1969 in Olongapo City, Zambales. His American serviceman-father (who was once stationed in Subic Naval Base in Olongapo City where he met Joey's mother) is of Jamaican descent.

Career
Blakdyak started singing in high school in Castillejos, Zambales. He began to earn money from singing when some comedian-performers included him in their shows performing in provinces. He soon migrated to Manila and formed his own band. In 1997, Viva Records discovered him and immediately signed him up to record an album.

With his hit singles "Good Boy" and "Noon at Ngayon", Blakdyak became the first local solo reggae act to achieve success in the entertainment field.

Blakdyak received his first Platinum Record Award for his first album Noon at Ngayon. At the 1998 Awit Awards, he won the award for Best Novelty Act and Best New Male Performer.

Death
Blakdyak was found dead inside his condominium unit in Sampaloc, Manila on November 21, 2016. His head was covered with a plastic bag, but the circumstances leading to his death are unclear. The Manila Police District said there were no evidence of forced entry. However, some of the late singer's possessions were found scattered on the unit's floor.

Personal life
He was married to non-showbiz wife Twinkle Estanislao-Formaran (died March 31, 2018 of heart attack), with whom he had four children.

Discography

Studio albums

Filmography

Film

References

1969 births
2016 deaths
Deaths from asphyxiation
Filipino male comedians
20th-century Filipino male singers
Filipino people of Jamaican descent
Kapampangan people
People from Olongapo
People from Sampaloc, Manila
People from Zambales
Reggae musicians
Tagalog people
20th-century Filipino male actors
21st-century Filipino male singers